Ghislaine Maxwell: Filthy Rich is an American Netflix original documentary film directed by Maiken Baird and Lisa Bryant. The film succeeds the miniseries Jeffrey Epstein: Filthy Rich, created by the same filmmakers. Its story is centered around the sex-trafficking trial of Ghislaine Maxwell, accomplice to Jeffrey Epstein, and details how she assisted in recruiting young women who would be deceived into performing sexual acts on Epstein. The film was released on November 25, 2022.

References

External links 
 
 
 

2022 films
2022 documentary films
Jeffrey Epstein
Ghislaine Maxwell
English-language Netflix original films
Documentary films about crime in the United States
Netflix original documentary films
Films about sexual abuse